Ilhéu de Cima Lighthouse is a lighthouse on Ilhéu de Cima located about 80 m above sea level. The lighthouse is the only building inside the integral nature reserve Ilhéus do Rombo.

It is a small white tower 4 meters in height with a white lantern, the lighthouse is solar powered. The caretaker's house is next door.

See also
List of lighthouses in Cape Verde

References

Brava Municipality
Lighthouses in Cape Verde